Jacques Borgeaud (born ) is an Australian male volleyball player. He was part of the Australia men's national volleyball team. He competed with the Australian team at the 2015 FIVB Volleyball Men's World Cup and 2015 FIVB Volleyball World League. He plays for University of Regina.

Clubs
  University of Regina (2015)

References

1991 births
Living people
Australian men's volleyball players
Place of birth missing (living people)